The Combat Service Identification Badge (CSIB) is a metallic heraldic device worn on the right side of the United States Army's Army Service Uniform that uniquely identifies a soldier's combat service with major U.S. Army formations.

Description
CSIB are silver or gold-colored metal and enamel devices that are 2 inches (5.08 cm) in height consisting of a design similar to the unit Shoulder Sleeve Insignia (SSI).

Wear
The Combat Service Identification Badge is worn on the lower right pocket for male soldiers and on the right side parallel to the waistline for female soldiers. Soldiers can wear the CSIB on the new blue Army Service Uniform, Class A and Class B. The CSIB cannot be worn on the Army Combat Uniform (ACU) or the discontinued Army Green Uniform. U.S. soldiers will continue to wear the subdued Shoulder Sleeve Insignia-Former Wartime Service on their right sleeve of the ACU blouse to denote combat service. The Shoulder Sleeve Insignia-Former Wartime Service was also worn on the Army Green "Class A" Uniform, until that uniform was discontinued in 2015. The CSIB is ranked fifth in the order of precedence for identification badges.

References

External links
 U.S. Army webpage on the Army Service Uniform
 CSIBs on Institute of Heraldry website
 Army Times article; Green Class A uniforms out

United States military badges
Heraldry of the United States Army